The Bloomington Ferry Trail Bridge is a bicycle trail / pedestrian bridge over the Minnesota River between Bloomington and Shakopee.  It opened in 1998, replacing the old Bloomington Ferry Bridge, a 2-lane vehicle swing bridge demolished upon the completion of the new Bloomington Ferry Bridge approx. 3/4 mi. upstream in 1996.

See also
 List of crossings of the Minnesota River

References

External links
Map: 
https://web.archive.org/web/20101218134111/http://modernsteel.com/Uploads/Issues/July_2000/0007_18_bloomington.pdf

Bridges completed in 1998
Pedestrian bridges in Minnesota
Cyclist bridges in the United States
Bridges in Hennepin County, Minnesota
Buildings and structures in Scott County, Minnesota
Bridges over the Minnesota River